Sevil Yuldasheva (born 9 January 2002) is an Uzbekistani tennis player.

Yuldasheva has a career-high ITF junior ranking of 575, achieved on 5 September 2016.

Yuldasheva made her WTA Tour main-draw debut at the 2017 Tashkent Open, in the doubles draw partnering Olesya Kim.

ITF finals

Doubles: 5 (5 runner–ups)

ITF Junior finals

Singles (1–1)

Doubles (0–4)

References

External links
 
 

2002 births
Living people
Uzbekistani female tennis players
21st-century Uzbekistani women